Milad Bagheri (born November 11, 1994) is an Iranian football defender who currently plays for Iranian football club FC Pars Jonoubi Jam in the Persian Gulf Pro League.

Bagheri joined Sanat Mes Kerman after the excellent performance in the League 2 (Iran) with the Kimia Farayand and then the Azadegan League with the Pars Jonoubi.

After canceling the deal with Esteghlal, he returned to his former Pars Jonoubi team in the winter of 2020.

Club career

Pars Jonoubi jam 
In the 2016 transfer season, he joined the Pars Jonoubi jam team and was separated from the team after a season in the team.

Sanat Mes Kerman 
In the transfer season of 2017, he joined the Sanat Mes of Kerman and after two seasons in the team and play in the game against Sepahan in the 2018 Cup, he separated from the team and joined the Esteghlal of Tehran.

Esteghlal Tehran 
In 2019 transfer season, he joined the Esteghlal of Tehran with a three-year contract.

Pars Jonoubi jam 
In the winter of 2020, he signed a new contract with his former team, terminating his previous contract.

References

External links
 Milad Bagheri at PersianLeague.com

1994 births
Living people
Iranian footballers
Sanat Mes Kerman F.C. players
F.C. Pars Jonoubi Jam players
Sportspeople from Tehran
Association football defenders